Ignacy Bąk (born 11 August 1995) is a Polish handball player for Wilhelmshavener HV and the Polish national team.

References

1995 births
Living people
People from Tychy
Polish male handball players
21st-century Polish people